Patrouilleführer (en: patrol leader) was a military rank of the k.u.k. Austro-Hungarian Army (1867–1918). It might be comparable to enlisted men OR2/ Private 1st class ranks in Anglophone armed forces.

However, in German speaking armed forces it was equivalent to the Gefreiter ranks (OR-2).

In the k.u.k. Austro-Hungarian Army it was used by the k.u.k. Kaiserjäger as well as the k.u.k. Feldjäger; later also in the Standschützen troops, and the k.u.k. Cavalry. It was also corresponding to Gefreiter ( of the k.u.k. Infantry, Sanitätsgefreiter (en: medical gefreiter) of the k.u.k. Medical corps, as well as to Vormeister of the k.u.k. Artillery corps and to the k.u.k. Machine gun troops.

Then rank insignia was a single white celluloid-star on grass-green stand-up collar of the so-called Waffenrock (en: uniform jacket) on gorget patch with a grass-green background (de: Paroli).

Rank insignia

See also

References 

 Rest-Ortner-Ilmig: Des Kaisers Rock im 1. Weltkrieg – Uniformierung und Ausrüstung der österreichisch-ungarischen Armee von 1914 bis 1918. Verlag Militaria, Wien 2002. .

Military ranks of Austria
Austro-Hungarian Army